Katherine L. Gordon is a Canadian poet with numerous publications to her credit. She lives and writes in the Eramosa River valley near Guelph, Ontario, and also works as an editor, independent publisher and literary critic. Her work has been published internationally in several languages, including Chinese and Hindi.

Books
 1998: An Impact of Butterflies, Independent,  
 2000: Saving Camelot, Independent,  
 2005: October: from Confederation to contemporary - Canadian poets write of October (Editor)Poetry and Good Cheer Press ISBN (missing)
 2006: Restless Spring: from Confederation to contemporary - Canadian poets write of Spring (Editor)Poetry and Good Cheer Press ISBN (missing)
 2008: Translating Shadows, Craigleigh Press, 
 2009: In Moonlight the Sky Will Slide (with Helen Bar-Lev), Cyclamens and Swords (Israel), 
 2010: Portals (with Stanley J. White & Becky D. Alexander), Craigleigh Press, 
 2011: Spirit Valley Rambles: in the company of poets (Editor) Valley Poets 
 2013: Telling Lies (with S.J. White) Cyclamens and Swords Publishing (Israel)

Selected chapbooks
 2002: Moon Flares (with I.B. Iskov)
 2004: Space Alchemy (with I.B. Iskov and Joan McGuire)
 2005: How to Dance Naked in the Moonlight (with Lenny Everson)
 2005: A Conjunction of Hearts: A Renga (with Joan McGuire)
 2007: Coast Lines (with Trish Shields) 
 2007: Feast of Equinix (Anthology) edited by K. Gordon 
 2008: Seven by Seven Dreams (with Stanley J. White)
 2008: A Week of Thoughts (with Stanley J. White)

External links
 Katherine L. Gordon at Edgar Allan Poet

20th-century Canadian poets
21st-century Canadian poets
Canadian women poets
Living people
People from Wellington County, Ontario
Writers from Ontario
20th-century Canadian women writers
21st-century Canadian women writers
Year of birth missing (living people)